Justice Swatanter Kumar is a retired justice of the Supreme Court of India and former Chairperson of the National Green Tribunal. He is also former Chief Justice of Bombay High Court and Judge of Delhi High Court and Punjab and Haryana High Court.

Biography
Kumar enrolled as an advocate with the Delhi Bar Council on 12 July 1971. He practiced in various High Courts, Tribunals and the Supreme Court, and served as an Additional District & Sessions Judge in the Himachal Pradesh High Court from February, 1983 till his resignation in October 1983, and thereafter resumed practice at New Delhi. He was appointed an Additional Judge of the Delhi High Court on 10 November 1994, transferred to P&H on 30 November 1994, and was appointed a permanent Judge on 30 November 1995. He transferred to Delhi on 4 October 2004 and was appointed Chief Justice of Bombay High Court on 31 March 2007.

The appointment of Kumar as a judge of the Supreme Court by then President Mrs. Pratibha Patil was announced by the Law and Justice Ministry in December 2009.

He was appointed the chairperson of National Green Tribunal on 20 December 2012 and retired on 19 December 2017.

Sexual harassment allegations 

In 2014, a law intern alleged that Justice Kumar sexually harassed her. Justice Kumar said that these allegations are a part of a "malicious conspiracy to damage his reputation".

References

Living people
1947 births
Justices of the Supreme Court of India
Chief Justices of the Bombay High Court
20th-century Indian judges